Ramón Carnicer i Batlle (October 24, 1789 – March 17, 1855) was a Spanish composer and opera conductor, today best known for composing the National Anthem of Chile.

Biography
Carnicer was born in Tàrrega, Spain. He was a pupil of Francesc Queralt. His first major positions were as conductor for the opera, and he was influential in the development of the Spanish national opera style, zarzuela. He conducted the Italian Opera in Barcelona from 1818 to 1820, and the Royal Opera in Madrid from 1828 to 1830, as well as composing nine operas.

In 1830, he accepted a position as professor of composition at the Madrid Conservatory, which he would retain until his retirement in 1854. He composed a variety of songs, church music, and symphonies; his best-remembered composition today being the National Anthem of Chile. He died in Madrid in 1855.

Works

Opera
Some of his operas are lost, but are known from references in documents of the period. However the authorship of several of the pieces is not fully clear.

 Adele di Lusignano: Melodramma semiserio (1819), Opera in Italian, in two acts
 Elena e Costantino: Dramma eroico-comico in due atti (1821, premiered again in 2005), Opera in Italian, libretto by Andrea Leone Tottola
 Il dissoluto punito, ossia Don Giovanni Tenorio (1822, premiered again in 2006), Opera in Italian, in two acts, libretto by Giovanni Bertati.
 Elena e Malvina (1827), Opera in two acts
 Cristoforo Colombo (1829), Opera
 Eufemio di Messina (1832), Opera
 Guglielmo Tell (1834), Opera
 Eran due or sono tre, o sea, Gli esposti (1836), Opera buffa in two acts. Libretto by Jacopo Ferretti
 Ismalia o Morte ed amore (1838), Opera in two acts
 Laura y Don Gonzalo (1841), òpera in 4 acts. Music attributed to Carnicer. Libretto attributed to Manuel Bretón de los Herreros
 Ipermestra (1843), drama in three acts. Words by Pietro Metastasio. Authorship discussed
 Lucrezia Borgia.  Attributed opera, some believe he only collaborated in the composition
 El sacristán de Toledo, opera. It's said he had only collaborated, composing incidental music

Instrumental
 Fantasía en mi bemol mayor, for clarinet
 Gran sinfonía en Re (1839)
 Fantasía original para clarinete con acompañamiento de piano (1849) 
 Capricho para contrabajo con acompañamiento de piano (1852) (Capricho for doublebass with piano accompaniment) 
 Melodía fantástica con acompañamiento de piano
 Sinfonía oriental
 Solo de flauta (solo for flute)
 Salmòdia for organ
 6 Sonates per  instrument de tecla''' 
 Obertura (sinfonía) Composed for the premier of  the opera Il barbiere di Siviglia by Rossini in Barcelona (1818) 
 A second overture for that same opera

Vocal
 El caramba: canción andaluza (ca. 1832), Voice and piano or guitar 
 Completas Fratres a 4 v., 4 voices, 6 instruments, accompaniment and continuo
 La criada: canción española (ca. 1832), voice, guitar and piano
 El currillo: canción andaluza (ca. 1835), voice, guitar and piano
 La gitanilla (ca. 1831), song for voice, guitar and piano
 Himno a los defensores de Gandesa (1838).
 Himno patrio de la República de Chile  (1828)
 Himno patriótico, con motivo de la publicación del Estatuto Real (1834)
 Himno patriótico [para el] cumpleaños de la Reina Doña Isabel II (1835)
 El julepe: polo (1823), song for voice and guitar
 Misa de Réquiem (1929), 4 voices and orchestra, in Latin. For Maria Josepha Amalia de Saxony, Ferdinand  VII third wife
 Misa de Réquiem (1842), 4 voices and orchestra, in Latin 
 Misa solemne (entre 1806 i 1808), 8 voices and orchestra
 El músico y el poeta (Los maestros de la Raboso), tonadilla a dúo El no sé, song for voice, guitar and piano
 La noticia feliz: polo y seguidillas (1823), song for voice, guitar and piano
 El nuevo sereni (1825), song for voice, guitar and piano or guitar 
 Odas de Anacreonte (1832), text original grec d'Anacreont i traducció castellana de José del Castillo y Ayensa, comprèn les cançons per a veu i piano De si mismo, A una muchacha i Del amor y la abeja 
 El poder de las mugeres: canción española con acompañamiento de piano y guitarra (1836)
 Psalmodia que contiene todos los tonos (1818)
 Tantum Ergo Tonadilla de la cantinera (1813)
 Vigilias con orquesta para las exequias de Fernando VII (1833), in Latin
 El chairo: canción española cantada en la ópera "El barbero de Sevilla"'' (1833), lyrics by Agustín Azcona

References

1789 births
1855 deaths
19th-century classical composers
19th-century Spanish composers
19th-century Spanish male musicians
Composers from Catalonia
Conductors (music) from Catalonia
Opera composers from Catalonia
Male conductors (music)
Male opera composers
National anthem writers
People from Tàrrega
Spanish classical composers
Spanish male classical composers
Spanish opera composers
Spanish Romantic composers